This a chronological list of the last surviving veterans of military insurgencies, conflicts and wars around the world. The listed wars span from the 13th century BC to the Korean War.

Classical antiquity 
 Ramesses II (1303–1213 BC) – Egyptian Pharaoh who, as a young man, fought many battles with the Hittites and Shardana pirates and died aged 90.
 Aristodemus of Sparta (c. 530–479 BC) – The "Coward of Thermopylae", who was the only Spartan to survive the Battle of Thermopylae.
 Marcus Valerius Corvus (370 BC?–270 BC) – Led the Roman army in the First Samnite War and reputedly lived to the age of 100.
 King Masinissa (c. 238 BC–c. 148 BC) – Led the Numidians during the Second Punic War and died at the age of 90.

Middle Ages

Muslim–Quraysh Wars (622–630)
 Abu al-Yusr Ka'b ibn Amr (599–675) – Muslim. Last soldier to serve under Muhammad at the Battle of Badr.

Norman conquest of England (1066–1088)
 Robert de Beaumont, 1st Earl of Leicester (1040–1118) – Norman. Last nobleman proven to have fought alongside William the Conqueror at the Battle of Hastings.

Early modern period 
These cases, particularly with respect to the ages claimed by the veterans, cannot be verified as it was common in pre-industrialised societies for elders to exaggerate their age.
Henry Jenkins (1501?–1670) - English longevity claimant. Claimed to have carried arrows for English archers at Battle of Flodden (1513) when aged 12.
 Anton Grolekofsky (1671/1672?–1785) – Polish soldier who lived in Sweden. Claimed to have fought in the Nine Years' War, Russo-Swedish War (1741–43) and Polish-Swedish War.
 Andreas Nielsen (1660?–1782) – Norwegian soldier. Claimed to be the last Scanian War veteran, to have had a long military career and seen many battles.
 Christian Jacobsen Drakenberg (1626?–1772) – Norwegian sailor. Claimed to have fought for Frederick III of Denmark-Norway in the Dano-Swedish War (1657–58) and again from 1675 to 1681 in the Scanian War.

17th century

Indian Wars (1622–1924)
 Otto D. Van Norman (1876–1981) – United States. Served in the local posse during the Battle of Kelley Creek.
 Frederick Fraske (1872–1973) – United States. Last Army veteran.
 Hubert V. Eva (1869–1971) – United States. Last participant of the Battle of Sugar Point, the last battle fought between Native Americans and the U.S. Army.
 John Daw (1870–1965) – United States. Last Indian Scout.
 Dewey Beard (1857–1955) – Lakota Tribe. Last Native American participant of the Battle of the Little Big Horn. Also survived Wounded Knee.
 David McCoy (1790–1895) – United States. Fought in Tecumseh's War. Saw Chief Tecumseh die while fighting in the Battle of the Thames. Served in the War of 1812.
 Josiah Allen (1800–1891) – United States. Enlisted at 14 to serve in the Creek War.

English Civil War (1642–1651) 
 William Walker of Ribchester, Lancashire (1626?–1736) – Royalist. Claimed to have fought in the Battle of Edgehill in 1642 for Charles I.
 William Hiseland (1620?–1732) – Royalist. Last survivor of the Battle of Edgehill. Also fought in the Williamite War in Ireland and the War of the Spanish Succession. Retired with rank of sergeant. For 80-year service to the king, he became one of the earliest admitted to Royal Hospital Chelsea.
 John Read (1633–1730) – Parliamentarian. Joined Cromwell's army at 16 years old. Later emigrated to the American colonies and became a member of the Connecticut House of Representatives.

First Anglo-Dutch War (1652–1654) 
 Richard Haddock (1629–1714) – Commonwealth of England. Served in the Royal Navy.

18th century

Great Northern War (1700–1721) 
 Petro Kalnyshevsky (1690, or 1691?–1803) – Cossack Hetmanate, Russia. Served in a Zaporozhian Cossacks Regiment. Also fought in 1735–39 and 1768–74 Russo-Turkish Wars (by which time he was an Ataman).
 Abraham Lindqvist (1696–1799) – Sweden. Served as a Dragoon under Charles XII

War of the Spanish Succession (1701–1714) 
 Ambrose Bennett (or Tennant) (1693/94–1800) – Great Britain. Served at the Battle of Malplaquet and reputedly died at the age of 106.

Jacobite risings (1719–1745) 
 Peter Grant (1714?–1824) – Jacobite. Fought at Culloden, Falkirk Muir and Prestonpans.

War of the Polish Succession (1733–1738) 
 Jean Thurel (1698?–1807) – France. Also served in the War of the Austrian Succession, the Seven Years' War and the American Revolutionary War. Known as "oldest soldier of Europe."

Russo-Turkish wars (1735–1774) 
 Petro Kalnyshevsky (1691?–1803) – Zaporozhian Cossacks. Also fought in Great Northern War and Russo-Turkish War (1768–1774) (by which time he was an Ataman).

French and Indian War (1754–1763) 
 John Owen (1741–1843) – Great Britain. Also fought in American Revolutionary War. Buried in Warren, Pennsylvania.
 David Thompson (1736–1836) – Great Britain. Last pensioner. Lost an arm at Fort William Henry. Later served in the American Revolution.
 Michel-Eustache-Gaspard-Alain Chartier de Lotbinière (1748–1822) – France. Died in Montreal, Quebec, British Empire.

Seven Years' War (1754–1763) 
 Johann Heinrich Behrens (1735–1844) – Prussia. Died in Wolfenbüttel.
 Ezekiel Blackmarr (1742–1841) – Great Britain. Born in the American colonies. Enlisted in British forces and was their last survivor of the Battle of Havana.
 Paul François de Quelen de la Vauguyon (1746–1828) – France. Died in Paris.

American Revolutionary War (1775–1783) 
 Daniel Bakeman (1759–1869) – United States. Alleged veteran. Awarded pension via Congress, though no support of service has been located.
 John Gray (1764–1868) – United States. Last verifiable veteran although period of service was too short for him for pension qualification.
 Lemuel Cook (1759–1866) – United States. Last official veteran; honorable discharge signed by George Washington.

Inconfidência Mineira (1789) 
 Padre Manuel Rodrigues da Costa (1754–1844) – Inconfidentes. Also participated in the Independence of Brazil and in the Liberal Rebellions of 1842.
 José de Resende Costa (1766–1841) – Inconfidentes.

French Revolution (1789–1799) 
 Giovanni Battista Campanella (1776–1884) – France. Served in Italy during the French Revolutionary Wars and later in the 1812 Russian campaign.
 Arthur Dardenne (1776–1872) – France. Last surviving person to have taken part in the Storming of the Bastille.
 Nicolas Savin (1768?–1894) – France. Enlisted in 2nd Regiment of Hussars in 1798. 1768 figure proclaims he was approximately 126 at time of death. Later served under Napoleon and was awarded the Legion d'Honneur.

Irish Rebellion of 1798 
 William Kinsella (1775–1870) – Irish rebel. Fought at Castlecomer.

19th century

Napoleonic Wars (1803–1815)
 Vincent Markiewicz (1795?–1903) – France. Claimed last Polish veteran. Fought for Napoleon. In 1912 there were three Polish men who claimed to have fought at Borodino, but it is unlikely they were real veterans due to lack of documentation and improbable age ranges from 120 to 133.
 Geert Adriaans Boomgaard (1788–1899) – France. Last Dutch veteran and verified veteran. Europe's oldest man at the time of his death. He fought for Napoleon in the 33ème Régiment Léger.
 Louis Victor Baillot (1793–1898) – France. Last veteran of the Battle of Waterloo. Also saw action at siege of Hamburg.
 Henry James (1799–1898) – United Kingdom. Last Royal Navy veteran. Saw action off Toulon.
 Lars Jespersen Kike (1796–1897) – Norway. Last Norwegian veteran of the Swedish-Norwegian War.
 Leonard Meesters (1796–1896) – France. Last Belgian veteran. Fought for Napoleon.
 Josephine Mazurkewicz (1794–1896) – France. Last female veteran. Assistant surgeon in Napoleon's army. Later partook in Crimean War.
 Ferdinand Scharnhorst (1797?–1893) – United Kingdom. Last British Army participant of Waterloo. Served in the King's German Legion.
 Gaspar Costela Vasquez (1787–1892) – Spain. Last veteran of the Battle of Trafalgar. Served in the navy aboard .
 Vasilij Nikolaevich Kochetkov (1785?–1892) – Russia. Enlisted 7 March 1811. Served in Grenadier Lifeguard Regiment at Borodino. Served 66 1/2 years until 12 October 1877 when wounded out of service in the Russian-Ottoman War.
 Joseph Sutherland (1789–1890) – United Kingdom.
 August Schmidt (1795–1899) – Prussia. German veteran and the last Prussian veteran of the conflict. He fought in the Battle of Bautzen, Battle of Großbeeren, Battle of Dennewitz, Battle of Leipzig, Battle of Laon and in the Battle of Waterloo.

War of 1812 (1812–1815) 
 Hiram Cronk (1800–1905) – United States. Served in a New York Infantry Regiment.
 Lewis Tobias Jones (1797–1895) – United Kingdom. Also a Napoleonic Wars veteran.

Seminole Wars (1816–1858) 
 Jacob C. Marsh (c. 1818–1917) – United States. Last participant of the Second Seminole War.

Greek War of Independence (1821–1832) 
 John W. Stainer (1808–1907) – United Kingdom. Last survivor of the Battle of Navarino.
 Apostolos Mavrogenis (1798–1906) – Greece. Served in the Army as a doctor. Served at Dervenakia and Drampala.
 Louis Pèlabon (1814–1906) – France. Served in the Navy on the Sirène. Fought at Navarino.

July Revolution (1830) 
 Auguste Lebailly (1815–1911) – Orléanist.

Belgian Revolution (1830–1831) 
 Johannes van den Boom (1817–1918) – United Netherlands. Joined as a drummer boy at 14.
 Corstiaan Hagers (1811–1915) – United Netherlands. Last holder of the Metal Cross.
 Alexandre Fournier (1812–1914) – France.
 Jean-Philippe Lavalle (1809–1913) – Belgian Rebels.

Black Hawk War (1832) 
 Henry L. Riggs (1812–1911) – United States.

Texas War of Independence (1835–1836) 
 William Physick Zuber (1820–1913) – Texas. Last veteran of the Battle of San Jacinto.
 Benjamin Franklin Highsmith (1817–1905) – Texas. Courier at the Alamo.

Ragamuffin War (1835-1845) 
 Anísio Manoel de Souza (1822–1938) – Riograndense Republic. Later served in the Paraguayan War. Oldest soldier in Brazilian Army's history.

Rebellions of 1837–1838 
 Samuel Filgate (1818–1919) – United Kingdom.
 Nelson Truax (1818–1915) – Hunters' Lodges. Fought at the Windmill.
 François X. Matthieu (1818–1914) – Parti Patriote.

First Opium War (1839–1842) 
 John Bubeer (1820–1921) – United Kingdom.

Mexican–American War (1846–1848) 
 Owen Thomas Edgar (1831–1929) – United States. Served on the USS Potomac and USS Allegheny.
 Antonio Rincón Gallardo (c. 1833–1928) – Mexico. Enlisted at 13 years old and served at Churubusco in 1847.

Hungarian Revolution of 1848 
 József Fischl (1827–1929) — Hungary. Served at Isaszeg and Segesvár.
 István Lebo (1826–1928) — Hungary. Last resident of the Hungarian Veterans Home.
 Artúr Görgey (1818–1916) — Hungary. Last Hungarian General.

Second Anglo-Sikh War (1848–1849) 
 John Stratford (1829–1932) — East India Company. Fought in the battles of Ramnagar, Challianwala, and Gujrat. Later served in the Anglo-Persian War as well as the Indian Mutiny.

First Schleswig War (1848–1851) 
 Jørgen Jørgensen Birkholm (1829–1931) — Denmark.
 Detlef Marxen (1826–1930) — Germany.

Crimean War (1853–1856) 
 Timothy (circa 1844 – 3 April 2004)  — British Empire. Ship's mascot of HMS Queen (and tortoise).
 James Gray (1836–1939) — British Empire. Served in the Royal Marine Artillery aboard .
 Yves Prigent (1833–1937) — French Empire. Served in the Navy on the frigate  Persévérante.
 Cotton Edwin Theobald (1836–1936) — British Empire. Officer of the 55th Foot. Possibly last British officer. Also served in the Indian Mutiny and on the North-West Frontier.
 Edwin Bezar (1838–1936) — British Empire. Hostilities had ceased by the time he arrived; he worked on re-interring the dead and building cemetery walls. Also served in the New Zealand Wars.
 Luigi Parachini (c. 1832–1930) — Sardinia. Served under General La Màrmora.
 Edwin Hughes (1830–1927) — British Empire. Last survivor of Charge of the Light Brigade.

Eureka Rebellion (1854) 
 William Edward Atherdon (1838–1936) — Stockade rebels.

Indian Mutiny (1857–1859) 
 Charles Palmer (1847–1940) — British Empire. Nine-year-old boy who participated in the Siege of Lucknow.
 George Chrystie (1841–1939) — British Empire. Last British Army veteran.

New Zealand Wars (1845–1872) 
 Thomas Baker (1853–1948) — British Empire. Served in the Armed Constabulary.
 Te Huia Raureti (c.1840–1935) — Māori. Kīngitanga Warrior. Served under Chief Rewi Maniapoto in the defence of Ōrākau Pā.

Second Italian War of Independence (1859) 
 Anton Neubauer (1836–1941) — Austrian Empire. Last survivor of the Battle of Solferino.
 Simone Piffaretti (1843?–1940) — Italy. Fought at San Fermo, Magenta, and Solferino.
 François Ribet (1835–1936) — French Empire.
 William John Newby (1832–1934) — British Empire. Last member of British Legion.

Expedition of the Thousand (1860–1861) 
 Giovanni Battista Egisto Sivelli (1843–1934) — Red Shirts. Also fought in the Third War of Independence.

American Civil War (1861–1865)

Union 
 Albert Woolson (1850–1956)

Confederacy 
 Last surviving Confederate veterans

Most cases are questionable, though it should be remembered that many Confederate records were destroyed or lost to history. Unlike the U.S. Armed Forces archives, the Confederate Armed Forces records had no official archive system after the war. However, for most of the cases investigated, the ages of the claimants alone were enough to prove their claim was false. Walter Williams was generally acknowledged as the "last Confederate veteran" in 1950s newspapers. However, in September 1959 an exposé by The New York Times revealed that he was in fact born in 1854 in Itawamba County, Mississippi, and not 1842 as claimed. Still, since John B. Salling and all the other claimants were dead, Williams was celebrated as the last Confederate veteran after his death on 20 December 1959.

Salling's own status is disputed. In 1991, William Marvel examined the claims of Salling and several other "last Civil War veterans" for a piece in the Civil War history magazine Blue & Gray. Marvel found census data that indicated Salling was born in 1858, not 1846. Although in 1900 Salling supplied a birthdate of March 1858, he appears to have been born around 1856, still too late to have served in the Confederate Army. The 1860 census lists him as 4 years old, and the 1870 census as 14. William Lundy is listed as 1 year old on the 1860 census, and from 1870 until 1930 he gave census marshals ages that reflected birthdates as early as 1853 and as late as 1860. He did not push his birthdate back to the 1840s until he applied for a Confederate pension from the state of Florida. In the same piece, Marvel confirmed Woolson's claim to be the last surviving Union Army veteran and asserted that Woolson was the last genuine Civil War veteran on either side. However, Marvel did not present research establishing who, among the several other Confederate claims from the 1950s, some of which appear to be genuine, was the real last Confederate veteran.

French invasion of Mexico (1861–1867) 
 Jules Pujos (1846–1942) – French Empire.
 Francisco Arellano Zenteno (1842–1935) – Mexico. Fought at the battles of Puebla, La Carbonera and Tuxtepec. Previously served in the Reform War.

January Uprising (1863–1865) 
 Feliks Bartczuk (1846–1946) – Poland.

Second Schleswig War (1864) 
 Ludwig Herman Klein (1846–1943) – Denmark. Last Naval veteran. Served on the Geiser.
 Ove Henning Jacobsen (1841–1941) – Denmark. Last Army veteran. Fought at Dybbøl.

Paraguayan War (1864-1870) 
 Pedro Guedes do Amaral (1846–1954) – Brazilian Army. Later served in the Federalist Revolution and in the War of Canudos.
 Pedro Hahn (1850–1949) – Brazilian Army. Last German-Brazilian veteran.

Fenian raids (1866–1871) 
 Henry Bayles Hooke (1849–1954) – Canada. Fought in the raid of 1866 at Ridgeway.
 William Craig (1850–1951) – Canada. Fought in the raids of 1870–71.

Expedition to Abyssinia (1867–1868) 
 Adrian Jones (1845–1938) – British Empire. Served as veterinary officer, believed to be last British survivor. Also served in First Boer War and Nile Expedition.

Franco-Prussian War (1870–1871) 
 Seraphin Pruvost (1849–1955) – France.
 Karl Glöckner (1845–1953) – Germany.

Paris Commune (1871) 
 Adrien Lejeune (1847–1942) – Communards. Last Communard.
 Antonin Desfarges (1851–1941) – Communards. Last député.
 Eugène François Louis Liné (1850–1940) – France.

Third Anglo-Ashanti War (1873–1874) 
 Harry Figg (1855–1953) – British Empire. Died in Sydney, Australia. Also served in the Zulu War, First Boer War and Second Boer War.

Russo-Turkish War (1877–1878) 
 Nene Hatun (1857–1955) — Ottoman Empire. Fought at the Battle of Erzurum.
 Mikhail Promtov (1857–1951) — Imperial Russian Army.

Second Anglo-Afghan War (1878–1880) 
 Alfred Hawker (1858–1962) – British Empire. Served in the British Army.

Zulu War (1879) 
 Harry Figg (1855–1953) – British Empire.
 Charles Wallace Warden (c.1854–1953) – British Empire. Transferred to First Foot in 1874.
 Frank Bourne (1854–1945) – British Empire. Last survivor of Rorke's Drift.

War of the Pacific (1879–1884) 
 Ricardo Orellana Olate (1860–1967) – Chile.
 Manuel Elías Bonnemaison Torres (1862–1961) – Peru. Served in the Navy on the Huáscar. Fought at Angamos.

First Boer War (1880–1881)
 Jacob "Jaap" Coetzer (1866–1969) – South African Republic. Boer veteran, served at the Battle of Majuba Hill.
 Thomas Jelley (1859–1955) – British Empire. Fought at Majuba Hill.

Anglo-Egyptian War (1882) 
 Albert Canning (1861–1960) – British Empire. Served in the 19th Hussars. Also served in the Mahdist War and World War I.

Mahdist War (1882–1899) 
 James Richard Miles (1879–1977) – British Empire. Last British Army veteran of the Battle of Omdurman.

Nile Expedition (1884–1885) 
 Edward Hyde Hamilton Gordon (1861–1955) – British Empire. Last officer.

North-West Rebellion (1885) 
 William Dickie Mills (1866–1971) – Canada. Fought at Fish Creek and Batoche.
 Jean Dumont (1858–1961) – Provisional Government of Saskatchewan. Fought at Batoche. Nephew of Gabriel Dumont.

Second Franco-Dahomean War (1892–1894) 
 Nawi (c. 1879–1979) – Dahomey. Last Dahomey Amazon.

Cuban War of Independence (1895–1898) 
 Juan Fajardo Vega (1881–1990) – Cuban rebels. Later served in the 1912 Negro Rebellion and the Cuban Revolution.

War of Canudos (1896–1897) 
 José Ciríaco de Santana (1872–1974) – Canudos inhabitants.
 Honório Vila Nova (1864–1969) – Canudos inhabitants. Later served in the Revolt of Juazeiro.

Spanish–American War (1898) 
 Jones Morgan (1882–1993) – United States. Served in the U.S. Cavalry.
 Aurelio Diaz Campillo (1878–1989) – Spain. Served in the Army.
 Archibald M. Forbis (1878–1981) – United States. Last Navy survivor of the Battle of Manila Bay.

Second Boer War (1899–1902) 
 George Frederick Ives (1881–1993) – British Empire. Last British veteran. Later emigrated to Canada.
 James Gordon Williams (1880-1988) – British Empire. Last Australian veteran. Later served in First World War and attempted to enlist for the Second World War but was rejected because he was too old.
 Pieter Arnoldus Krueler (1885–1986) – South African Republic. Later served in both world wars, the Spanish Civil War, and was a mercenary in the Congo Crisis.

Philippine–American War (1899–1902) 
 Nathan E. Cook (1885–1992) – United States.
 Walter Pleate (1876–1985) — United States. Served in the Army.

Boxer Rebellion (1899–1901) 
 Nathan E. Cook (1885–1992) – United States. Served in the Navy.
 Walter Pleate (1876–1985) — United States. Served in the Army.

20th century

Russo-Japanese War (1904–1905) 
 Mamoru Eto (1883–1992) – Empire of Japan.
 Alex Gory (1881–1989) – Russian Empire.

Macedonian Struggle (1904–1908) 
 Christos Papantoniou (1890–1995) – Greece.

Potemkin Mutiny (1905) 
 Ivan Beshoff (1885–1987) – Potemkin rebels. Fled to Ireland in 1913.

Revolt of the Lash (1910) 
 João Cândido Felisberto (1880–1969) – Leader and last known rebel. Also served in the Federalist Revolution.

Mexican Revolution (1910–1920) 
 Juan Carlos Caballero Vega (1900–2010) – Villistas. Pancho Villa's driver.
 Feliciano Mejia Acevedo (1899–2008) – Zapatistas.
 Antonio Gómez Delgado (1900–2007) – Villistas.
 Rafael Lorenzana (1899–2000) – Carrancistas. Became a Villista in 1915 after being captured.
 Teodoro García (1889–1999) – Federales. Fought for Díaz from 1910 to 1911.

Xinhai Revolution (1911–1912) 
 Yu Yuzhi (1889–1993) – Tongmenghui. Last participant of the Wuchang Uprising. Also served in the Defense of Yangxia.

Italo-Turkish War (1911–1912) 
 Michele Traini (1892–1996) – Italy. Sent to Libya in 1912. Returned home following WWI.

Balkan Wars (1912–1913) 
 Lăcătușu Dumitrașcu (1891–1999) – Romania. Served in the 11th Siret Regiment in 1913. Also served in WWI and WWII.
 Christos Papantoniou (1890–1995) – Greece. Also served in WWI and WWII.
 Hristo Getov-Obbov (1893–1994) – Bulgaria. Joined the Macedonian-Adrianopolitan Volunteer Corps in 1912. Also served in WWI.
 Hüseyin Kaçmaz (1884–1994) – Ottoman Empire. Also served in WWI.
 Danilo Dajković (1895–1993) – Montenegro. Also served in WWI.

Contestado War (1912–1916) 
 Firmino Rodrigues Martim (1894–c.2000) – Brazilian Army (vaqueanos).
Altino Bueno da Silva (1903–2014) – Last rebellious child and witness of the slaughter.

World War I (1914–1918) 

 Florence Green (1901–2012) – British Empire. Last Entente veteran and last veteran of World War I. Served as an officer's mess steward in the Royal Air Force; the Women's Royal Air Force.
 Claude Choules (1901–2011) – British Empire. Last combat veteran. Also last veteran to serve in both World Wars.
Frank Buckles (1901–2011) – United States. Last American veteran of World War I.  
 Harry Patch (1898–2009) – British Empire. Last soldier to fight in the trenches.
 Franz Künstler (1900–2008) – Austria-Hungary. Last Central Powers veteran.

Easter Rising (1916) 
 John "Jack" Rogers (1894–2000) – United Kingdom. Served in the Sherwood Foresters. Also served in WWI.
 Frederick Watson (1900–1997) – United Kingdom. Served in the Royal Dublin Fusiliers.
 Lily Kempson (1897–1996) – Irish Republic. Served in the Irish Citizen Army.
 William Conor Hogan (1898–1995) – Irish Republic. Served in the Irish Volunteers. Also served in the War of Independence and the Civil War.

October Revolution (1917) 
 Boris Gudz (1902–2006) – Red Army. Also fought in Russian Civil War.

Russian Civil War (1917–1922) 
Russian participants:
 Vladimir Shostak (1905–2010) – Anarchists (Black Army).
 Anatoly A. Wolin (1902–2007) – Red Army.
 Boris Gudz (1902–2006) – Red Army. Also fought in October Revolution.
 Igor Talysin (1898–2004) – White Army.
 Nikolai Fyodorov (1901–2003) – White Army.

Veterans of Allied Intervention:
 Yasuichi Sasaki (1898–2006) – Japan. Discharged as a Corporal in 1920.
 Warren V. Hileman (1901–2005) – United States. Stationed in Vladivostok.
 Harold Edwin Radford (1897–2003) – Canada. Stationed in Vladivostok.
 Alois Vocásek (1896–2003) – Czechoslovakia. Fought as a Legionnaire throughout Siberia on the Trans-Siberian Railway.
 Jean Piry (1896–2003) – France.
 Frank William Ivers (1902–2003) – United Kingdom. Last Naval veteran. Served in Royal Navy off Northern Russia.
 Harold Gunnes (1899–2003) – United States. Last veteran of the Polar Bear Expedition.

Finnish Civil War (1918) 
 Lauri Nurminen (1906–2009) – White Guards.
 Aarne Arvonen (1897–2009) – Red Guards.

Greater Poland Uprising (1918–1919) 
 Jan Rzepa (1899–2005) – Poland.

German Revolution of 1918–1919 
 Helmut Fink (1901–2009) – Weimar Republic. Served in the Freikorps.

Polish–Ukrainian War (1918–1919) 
 Grigory Ivanovich Kovpak (1905–2010) – Ukraine. Served in the Ukrainian Galician Army.
 Aleksander Sałacki (1904–2008) – Poland. Last Lwów Eaglet.

Estonian War of Independence (1918–1920) 
 Ants Ilus (1901–2006) – Estonia.
 Paavo Takula (1901–2004) – Finland. Last volunteer.
 Karl Jaanus (1899–2000) – Estonia. Last surviving Cross of Liberty recipient awarded during war.

Latvian War of Independence (1918–1920) 
 Arnolds Hofmanis (1900–2006) – Latvia. Died in Tukums, Latvia.
 Arvīds Lauris (1901–2003) – Latvia. Last surviving Order of Lāčplēsis recipient awarded during war.
 Kurt Andersen (1898–2003) – Germany. Served in the Iron Division.

Lithuanian Wars of Independence (1918–1920) 
 Kazys Varkala (1900–2005) – Lithuania. Fought against the Soviets and the Bermontians.
 Česlovas Januškevičius (1900–2001) – Lithuania. Last surviving Cross of Vytis recipient awarded during war. Fought the Polish in 1920.

Irish War of Independence (1919–1921) 
 Dan Keating (1902–2007) – Ireland. Served in the Irish Republican Army.
 Bert Clark (1899–2005) – United Kingdom. Served in the British Army.
 Hugh McIvor (1901–2002) – United Kingdom. Last member of the Royal Irish Constabulary

Polish–Soviet War (1919–1921) 
 Alexander Imich (1903–2014) – Poland.

Silesian Uprisings (1919–1921) 
 Wilhelm Meisel (1904–2009) – Silesian rebels.

Turkish War of Independence (1919–1923) 
 Salih Kuru (1906–2012) – Turkey. Carried ammunition to fronts.
 Mustafa Şekip Birgöl (1903–2008) – Turkey. Last combat veteran. Served in the Kuva-yi Milliye and later Turkish Armed Forces.

Rif War (1920–1926) 
 Francisco Nunez Olivera (1904–2018) – Spain.

Coto War (1921) 
 Reinel Cianca Gutiérrez (1901–2002) – Panama.

18 of the Copacabana Fort revolt (1922) 
 Altino Gomes da Silva (1904–1996) – Tenentistas.

March on Rome (1922) 
 Vasco Bruttomesso (1903–2009) – National Fascist Party.

Irish Civil War (1922–1923) 
 Dan Keating (1902–2007) – Irish Republic. Served in the Anti-treaty Irish Republican Army.
 Seán Clancy (1901–2006) – Irish Free State. Served in the Pro-treaty National Army.

Northern Expedition (1926–1928) 
 Hao Quande (1912–2017) – Republic of China. Joined the National Revolutionary Army in 1927. Last veteran of the 19th Route Army.

Cristero War (1926–1929) 
 Juan Daniel Macías Villegas (1912–2016) – Cristeros.

Chittagong armoury raid (1930) 
 Binod Bihari Chowdhury (1911–2013) – Anushilan Samiti.

Brazilian Revolution of 1930 
 Olimpio Martins Pires (1910–2020) – New State. Served as an MP in Minas Gerais. Also participated in the Revolution of 1932.

January 28 incident (1932) 
 Huang Shengyong (1905–2017) – Republic of China. Penultimate veteran of the 19th Route Army.

Constitutionalist Revolution (1932) 
 Alfredo Pires Filho (1920–2021) – São Paulo. Last rebel Boy Scout messenger. Later trained the Brazilian pilots during the World War II.
 Olimpio Martins Pires (1910–2020) – Brazil. Served in the PMMG. Also participated in the Revolution of 1930.
 Maria de Lourdes Pinto Picarelli (1913–2019) – São Paulo. Last female rebel combattant.
 Arlindo Leonardo Ribeiro (1913–2019) – São Paulo. Last Barretos rebel combattant.
 Zuleika Sucupira Kenworthy (1912–2017) – São Paulo. Last Jundiaí rebel combattant.
Natalino Antonio Augusto (1910–2014) – São Paulo. Last Campinas rebel combattant.
 José Mango (1913–2015) – São Paulo. Last rebel veteran of the Battle of Gravi.
Osvaldo Rafael Santiago (1915–2013) – São Paulo. Last Itapetininga rebel combattant.
 José Luiz Silveira (1909–c. 2011) – Brazil. Served in the BMRS. Last Battle of Cerro Alegre combattant. Also participated in the Revolution of 1923 and in the Revolution of 1930.

Long March (1934–1935)
Tu Tongjin (born 1914) – Chinese Red Army.

Brazilian communist uprising of 1935 
 Antero de Almeida (1906–2014) – National Liberation Alliance.

Spanish Civil War (1936–1939) 
 Delmer Berg (1915–2016) – United States. Last veteran of the Abraham Lincoln Brigade.
 Günther Scholz (1911–2014) – Germany. Last veteran of the Condor Legion.
 Josep Almudéver Mateu (1919–2021) – France. Last veteran of the International Brigades.

1936 Naval Revolt 
 José Júnior Barata (1916–2014) – Portuguese Navy rebels.

World War II (1939–1945) 
 See List of last surviving veterans of World War II

Korean War (1950–1953) 
Last surviving Korean War flying aces:
 Charles G. Cleveland (1927–2021) – United States.
Sergey Kramarenko (1923–2020) – Soviet Union.
Wang Hai (1926–2020) – China.
Ralph Puckett (born 1926) – United States. Last living Medal of Honor recipient.

See also 

 List of last surviving veterans of military operations
 List of centenarians (military commanders)
 List of last surviving World War I veterans
 List of last surviving Canadian war veterans
 Last European veterans by war
 Last surviving United States war veterans

References 

Lists of military veterans
Veterans
Military insurgencies